Bolu Fagborun (born ) is an English former professional rugby league footballer who has played in the 2000s and 2010s.

Background
Bolu Fagborun is of Nigerian descent, his first name is variously spelt; Bolouagi, Bolouaji, Boluagi, Boluaji, Boulagi or Boulaji.

References

1986 births
Living people
Batley Bulldogs players
Black British sportspeople
English people of Nigerian descent
Huddersfield Giants players
Nigeria national rugby league team players
Nigerian rugby league players
Nigerian sportspeople
Rochdale Hornets players
Rugby league wingers
Sheffield Eagles players
Sportspeople from Bradford
Sportspeople from Yorkshire
Rugby articles needing expert attention